James Arthur Dawes (16 June 1866 – 14 November 1921) was an English solicitor, businessman and Liberal Member of Parliament (MP) from 1910 to 1921.

Family and education 
James Arthur Dawes was the son of Richard Dawes of Castle Hill, Ealing, Middlesex, a solicitor in Angel Court, Throgmorton Street, London. He was educated at Harrow School and University College, Oxford where he gained MA and Bachelor of Civil Law degrees. In 1920 he married Violet Pridmore from Penge in Surrey. They do not appear to have had children.

Career 
Dawes qualified as a solicitor in 1891  and was admitted to his father's firm, Mssrs. Dawes and Sons, in January 1892  He was later a Justice of the Peace for the County of London. From the outset of the First World War, Dawes served with the Royal Naval Reserve and Royal Naval Volunteer Reserve raising to the rank of acting Commander by 1918. He was engaged in mine-sweeping operations and from July 1918 he served at the Admiralty. Unsurprisingly, one of Dawes recreations was yachting.

Southwark and London Politics 
Dawes had a home in Kennington Park Road in Southwark. He took a strong interest in local affairs and was Chairman of the Vestry of Newington, the equivalent of a Parish council, from 1897 to 1900. Dawes was then the first Mayor of the Borough of Southwark from 1900 to 1901 and Deputy Mayor the following year. He was re-elected mayor in 1913–14 and 1914–15. He also served as a founder member of the Metropolitan Water Board in 1903–1904. He was later elected as a member of the London County Council for the Progressive Party for Newington Walworth for various years between 1906 and 1913. In 1911 Dawes was appointed to the Joint Committee of the two Houses of Parliament to consider the Bill promoted by the Metropolitan Water Board to construct a series of new works and reservoirs on the River Thames at Staines. From 1912 to 1914 he was Chairman of the Insurance Committee for the County of London, created to administer the medical aspects of the National Insurance Act of 1911, which for the first time established compulsory contributory insurance against illness and unemployment for workers. Dawes Street, London SE 17 was named after him to commemorate his appointment as the first Mayor of the Borough of Southwark.

Parliament 
By 1908 Dawes had been selected as prospective Liberal candidate for Walworth in succession to Charles James O'Donnell who had decided not to contest the next election. Dawes was duly elected as Liberal MP for Walworth at the general election of January 1910. He held the seat with a slightly increased majority in December 1910. In 1918 his constituency disappeared in boundary changes but he was selected for the new local constituency of Southwark South East. He fought the 1918 general election as a Coalition Liberal, that is as a supporter of the Coalition Government of Prime Minister David Lloyd George. He presumably received the Coalition Coupon because he was not opposed by a Unionist candidate and won in a straight fight with Labour.

Death 
On 9 November 1921 Dawes was chosen as Mayor of Dartmouth in Devon where he had his country home. His appointment was not to last long however as he died on 14 November 1921 at Sydenham at the age of 55 years. His death caused a by-election in Southwark which was won by Thomas Ellis Naylor for Labour. Dawes was buried in the churchyard at Perivale, a suburb of Ealing.

Works 
Dawes wrote two associated pamphlets on National Insurance for the Liberal Party.
 National Health Insurance: Part 1 of the National Insurance Act 1911 – Liberal Publications Dept, 1912
 National Health Insurance: Part 2 of the National Insurance Act 1911 – Liberal Publications Dept, 1912

Dawes also published a Dissertation on the Law of Partnership in 1909 and was a co-author of the Report of the National Committee to Promote the Break-up of the Poor Law in 1910.

References

External links 
 

1866 births
1921 deaths
Liberal Party (UK) MPs for English constituencies
UK MPs 1910–1918
UK MPs 1918–1922
Members of London County Council
Mayors of places in Greater London
English solicitors
People educated at Harrow School
Alumni of University College, Oxford
Royal Naval Volunteer Reserve personnel of World War I
People from Ealing
Members of Southwark Metropolitan Borough Council
Politics of Devon
Progressive Party (London) politicians
Royal Navy officers of World War I
Royal Naval Reserve personnel